Batalov is a Russian masculine surname, its feminine counterpart is Batalova. It may refer to:
Aleksey Batalov (1928–2017), Russian actor
Andrei Batalov, Russian ballet dancer
Nikolai Batalov (1899–1937), Russian actor
Maria Batalova (born 1996), Russian ice hockey player
Rima Batalova (born 1964), Russian Paralympic athlete

Russian-language surnames